John Toplikar (February 24, 1956) is an American politician serving as a member of the Kansas House of Representatives from the 15th district. Elected in 2018, he assumed office in 2019.

Early life and education 
Toplikar was born and raised in Olathe, Kansas. After attending Johnson County Community College, he earned a Bachelor of Arts degree in communications from the University of Kansas and a Juris Doctor from the Washburn University School of Law.

Career 
From 1989 to 1991, Toplikar was a city official in Olathe. He was elected to the Johnson County Commission in 2003. Toplinkar served as a member of the Kansas House of Representatives from 1992 to 2002. Toplinkar has also worked as a carpenter and contractor. In 2014, he was an unsuccessful candidate for Kansas insurance commissioner, placing fifth in the Republican primary. In the 2018 election, Toplikar ran unopposed in the Republican primary and defeated Democratic nominee Chris Haulmark in the November general election.

References 

Living people
Politicians from Olathe, Kansas
People from Johnson County, Kansas
University of Kansas alumni
Washburn University School of Law alumni
Republican Party members of the Kansas House of Representatives
21st-century American politicians
20th-century American politicians
1956 births